Super Express USA is the largest Polish-American newspaper in the United States.

The newspaper has been published daily except Sundays and Holidays since April 15, 1996 and is distributed in New York, New Jersey,
Connecticut, Massachusetts, Pennsylvania and Chicago.

The New York headquarter office is located in Manhattan on John Street, near the World Trade Center. The publishers are Super Express USA and Media Express USA. Its president is Beata Pierzchała and executive editor is Adam Michejda.

Among many others famous writers for Super Express USA include:
 former prime minister - Kazimierz Marcinkiewicz
 former prime minister - Leszek Miller
 former president of the Polish Football Association - Michal Listkiewicz
 broadcast journalist, U.S correspondent, American producer & writer - Max Kolonko
 politician, author of the most popular blog in Poland - Janusz Korwin-Mikke
 the most famous Polish detective - Krzysztof Rutkowski

See also
 List of newspapers in New York
 List of New York City newspapers and magazines
 Media in Chicago

External links
www.se.pl Super Express USA website

Polish-American culture in Chicago
Polish-American culture in Connecticut
Polish-American culture in Massachusetts
Polish-American culture in New Jersey
Polish-American culture in New York City
Polish-American culture in Pennsylvania
Polish-language newspapers published in the United States
Super Express USA
Non-English-language newspapers published in New York (state)
Daily newspapers published in New York City